The Victoria Vikes women's basketball team represent the University of Victoria in the Canada West Universities Athletic Association of U Sports women's basketball. The Vikes have captured the Bronze Baby, awarded to the U Sports National Champions, a record nine times. The McKinnon Building and Gym was the former home of the Vikes, and the basketball court itself was named "Ken and Kathy Shields Court" in 2002, honouring the Vikes legendary basketball coaches.  As a side note, the facility also hosted the 1993 CIS women's basketball national championships and a 1999 Vancouver Grizzlies NBA intra-squad game.

Kathy Shields, the most accomplished head coach in program history, captured 15 Canada West titles (1979, 1980, 1981, 1982, 1984, 1985, 1986, 1991, 1994, 1995, 1996, 1997, 1998, 1999, 2000), along with eight national championships (1979, 1980, 1981, 1984, 1986, 1991, 1997, 1999). Of note, eight of her former players and assistant coaches became head coaches at the university level. Winning 320 out of 371 regular season games, Shields was bestowed the Order of Canada in 2016.

History
Beginning in 1975, the Vikes enjoyed a run of dominance that lasted until 1987. Enjoying 10 Canada West titles, along with five national titles, the 1990s would see a return to prominence. Highlighted by seven conference titles, including six consecutive, spanning from 1994 to 2000, the decade also saw three more national title performances.

Arriving at the University of Victoria in 1979, Tracie McAra would be part of a five-year run that saw the Vikes win 102 games, while losing only 14. Winning the Bronze Baby in three consecutive years (1980–82), the achievement complemented by four consecutive Canada West conference titles (1979–82).

Between 1985 and 1987, the Vikes would appear in three straight Canadian Interuniversity Athletic Union (now U Sports) gold medal games, winning in 1985 and 1987. During that stretch, Lori Clarke emerged as a Canada West conference All-Star and CIAU All-Canadian in every season. Winning the Nan Copp Player of the Year Award in 1987, it marked the crowning touch to her athletic sojourn at the University of Victoria.

The 1986-87 season would also mark a finale for Janet Fowler. In her final season, she averaged 17.5 points and 8.1 rebounds per game. Earning the Most Valuable Player Award of the Canadian Interuniversity Sport (now U Sports) Championship Tournament, the Vikes were 28-2 in conference play during the season.

Having played with the Vikes from 1981–85, hoisting the Bronze Baby twice, Sandy Espeseth returned for her final year in 1987-88. Leading the Vikes to a record of 18 wins, compared to 2 losses, Espeseth earned CIS First Team All-Canadian honors, averaging 12.4 points per game and a career-high 3.5 rebounds per game. Espeseth would later compete for Canada as a member of the National Cycling Team at the 1992 Barcelona Summer Olympics.

The Vikes captured their last Bronze Baby trophy in 2003. The first time that the program hosted the National Championships was in 1993, finishing as the runner-up versus the University of Winnipeg.

After eight seasons, head coach Dani Sinclair stepped down as head coach of the Vikes in March 2020. In her last season, the Vikes were 12-8. Throughout her career, the Vikes amassed 105 wins, compared only to 59 losses.

In May 2021, the Vikes hired former UBC Thunderbirds women's basketball player and coach Carrie Watts to be their new head coach. Having played for Debbie Huband at UBC, Watts captured the Bronze Baby trophy in 2004. Among her coaching achievements, Watts was an assistant coach for Team Canada at the 2019 Winter Universiade.

Season by season record

Individual Leader Scoring

Recent U Sports Tournament results

International
Lori Clarke : Canada women's national basketball team (1985–92)

Awards and honours

Canada West Awards

Canada West Hall of Fame
Victoria Vikettes, (1979-83): Canada West Hall of Fame - 2019 Inductee 
Kathy Shields: Canada West Hall of Fame - 2019 Inductee

Canada West All-Stars
2010 Canada West First Team All-Star : Kayla Dykstra
2009 Canada West First Team All-Star : Kayla Dykstra
1998 Canada West First Team All-Star : Lisa Koop
1997 Canada West First Team All-Star : Lisa Koop
1996 Canada West First Team All-Star : Lisa Koop
1991 Canada West First Team All-Star: Kelly Boucher
1990 Canada West First Team All-Star: Kelly Boucher
1989 Canada West First Team All-Star: Kelly Boucher
1988 Canada West First Team All-Star: Karla Karch
1988 Canada West Second Team All-Star: Kelly Boucher
1987 Canada West First-Team All-Star: Janet Fowler
1987 Canada West All-Star: Lori Clarke
1987 Canada West Second Team All-Star: Karla Karch
1986 Canada West All-Star: Lori Clarke
1985 Canada West All-Star: Lori Clarke
1983 Canada West All-Star: Tracie McAra
1982 Canada West All-Star: Tracie McAra
1981 Canada West All-Star: Tracie McAra
1981 Canada West First-Team All-Star: Luanne Krawetz
1980 Canada West First-Team All-Star: Luanne Krawetz
1980 Canada West First-Team All-Star: Carol Turney-Loos
1979 Canada West First-Team All-Star: Luanne Krawetz

Player of the Year
2009 Canada West Player of the Year : Kayla Dykstra
1998 Canada West Player of the Year : Lisa Koop
1997 Canada West Player of the Year : Lisa Koop
1996 Canada West Player of the Year : Lisa Koop

Coach of the Year
1979-80: Kathy Shields
1986-87: Kathy Shields
1991-92: Kathy Shields
1992-93: Kathy Shields
1994-95: Kathy Shields
1996-97: Kathy Shields
1997-98: Kathy Shields
2000-01: Kathy Shields

U Sports Awards
2003-04 Sylvia Sweeney Award Outstanding student-athlete: Krystal O'Bryne

All-Canadians
2010 CIS First Team All-Canadian: Kayla Dykstra
2009 CIS First Team All-Canadian: Kayla Dykstra
1998 CIS First Team All-Canadian: Lisa Koop
1997 CIS First Team All-Canadian: Lisa Koop
1996 CIS First Team All-Canadian: Lisa Koop
1991 CIS Second Team All-Canadian: Kelly Boucher
1988 CIS Second Team All-Canadian : Karla Karch
1987 CIS First Team All-Canadian: Janet Fowler
1987 CIAU All-Canadian: Lori Clarke
1986 CIAU All-Canadian: Lori Clarke
1985 CIAU All-Canadian: Lori Clarke
1983 CIAU First Team All-Canadian: Tracie McAra
1981 CIAU First Team All-Canadian: Luanne Krawetz
1980 CIAU First Team All-Canadian: Carol Turney-Loos

U Sports championship MVP
2002-03 Lindsay Anderson
1999-00 Lindsay Brooke
1997-98 Lindsay Brooke
1991-92 Jenny Sutton
1986-87 Janet Fowler
1984-85 Lori Clarke
1981-82 Luanne Hebb
1980-81 Shelly Godfrey
1979-80 Carol Turney-Loos

U Sports championship All-Star Team
1998 CIS Championship Tournament All-Star : Lisa Koop
1996 CIS Championship Tournament All-Star : Lisa Koop
1987 CIS Championship Tournament All-Star: Karla Karch
1983 CIAU Tournament All-Star: Tracie McAra
1981 CIAU Tournament all-star: Luanne Krawetz
1980 CIAU Tournament All-Star: Luanne Krawetz

Peter Ennis Award
Awarded to the Coach of the Year
2009-10 Peter Ennis Award: Brian Cheng
1998-99 Peter Ennis Award: Kathy Shields
1991-92 Peter Ennis Award: Kathy Shields
1979-80 Peter Ennis Award: Kathy Shields

Nan Copp Award
Awarded to the Player of the Year
2008-09: Kayla Dykstra
1986-87: Lori Clarke
1982-83: Tracie McAra
1981-82: Luanne Hebb
1979-80: Carol Turney-Loos

Tracy MacLeod Award
2008-09 Vanessa Forstbauer, Victoria

Victoria Vikes Hall of Fame
Class of 2019 Inductee: Lori Clarke
Class of 2017 inductee: Carol Turney-Loos
Class of 2012 inductee: 1981-82 Women’s Basketball Team
Class of 2006 Inductee: Luanne Krawetz-Hebb
Class of 2002 inductee: Kathy Shields

University Awards
2020 Victoria Vikes Provost Award for Excellence presented to a returning student-athlete with the highest academic average in the previous year Hannah Walline, Co-winner
2020 Victoria Vikes Varsity Highlights Awards: Marissa Dheensaw
1987 Victoria Vikes Female Athlete of the Year: Lori Clarke

Top 100
In celebration of the centennial anniversary of U SPORTS women’s basketball, a committee of U SPORTS women’s basketball coaches and partners revealed a list of the Top 100 women's basketball players. Commemorating the 100th anniversary of the first Canadian university women’s contest between the Queen’s Gaels and McGill Martlets on Feb. 6, 1920, the list of the Top 100 was gradually revealed over four weeks. A total of 11 Vikes were named to the Top 100.

References 

U Sports women's basketball teams
University of Victoria
Vikes
Women in British Columbia